Färingsö or Svartsjölandet is an island in Sweden's Lake Mälaren. It covers an area of 82.02 km². The island is a part of Ekerö Municipality. The largest village on the island is Stenhamra. The island is also named after the village of Svartsjö.

References

Islands of Mälaren
Populated places in Ekerö Municipality
Uppland